The Smådalarö Gård Open was a women's professional golf tournament on the Swedish Golf Tour, played between 2005 and 2012. It was always held at Smådalarö Gård near Stockholm, Sweden.

Winners

References

Swedish Golf Tour (women) events